Matthew O'Neill, 1st Baron Dungannon (alias Matthew Kelly, alias Feardorcha Ó Néill; 1520–1558), was an Irish aristocrat. He was accepted by Conn O'Neill as his natural son. Matthew was challenged by his half-brother Shane O'Neill over the succession to the Earldom of Tyrone and was murdered by some of his supporters.

Birth and origins 

Mathew was born about 1510, a son of Alison Kelly (née Roth) in Dundalk, the wife of a blacksmith in Dundalk. At the age of sixteen, Matthew was presented to Conn O'Neill, with whom Kelly had previously had an affair. Tyrone accepted that Matthew was his natural son.

{{Tree chart| |ArtON| |BrnD2| |HghT3|y|SbhOD|boxstyle=border-width: 1px; border-radius: 0.5em;
 |ArtON=[[Art MacBaron O'Neill|ArtMacBaron]]
 |BrnD2=Brian2nd EarlTyrone|boxstyle_BrnD2=border-width: 1px; border-radius: 0.5em; background: lavender;
 |HghT3=Hugh3rd EarlTyrone|boxstyle_HghT3=border-width: 1px; border-radius: 0.5em; background: lavender;
 |SbhOD=SiobhanO'Donnell'}}

 Marriage and children 
Around 1536 Matthew married Siobhan, daughter of Cú Chonnacht (Constantine) Maguire, lord of Fir Manach.

Matthew and Siobhan had three sons:
Brian (died 1562), called Lord Dungannon, de jure'' 2nd Earl of Tyrone, murdered
Hugh (c. 1550 – 1616), who succeeded as the 3rd Earl of Tyrone
Cormac (died 1613)

Matthew also had an illegitimate son:
Art MacBaron O'Neill (died 1618)

Baron Dungannon 
As part of the surrender and regrant policy brought in during the reign of Henry VIII, his father was in October 1542 made Earl of Tyrone with Matthew confirmed as his heir and made Baron of Dungannon. Both visited London to formally submit to the King.

Conflict with Shane O'Neill 
This arrangement was disputed by Matthew's legitimate half-brother Shane O'Neill, who had a larger and more powerful following. Shane's violent response crushed the government's hope for a peaceful succession. Matthew was killed by Shane's men in 1558, a year before Conn O'Neill died.

In his attempts to gain recognition of the title of Earl of Tyrone from the Crown, Shane suggested that Matthew had not really been Conn's son, and his real father was a blacksmith from Dundalk named Kelly. Shane tried to show Matthew's claims were weak under both the English law of primogeniture as well as the Gaelic custom of the strongest member of the family inheriting. Shane received some recognition of his role as head of the Ó Néills, but he was never made an earl. Shane was killed by the MacDonnells of Antrim in 1567.

Notes and references

Notes

Citations

Sources 

 
 
  – S to T
 
 

 

1558 deaths
16th-century Irish people
Assassinations in Ireland
Barons in the Peerage of Ireland
O'Neill dynasty
Peers of Ireland created by Henry VIII
People from County Tyrone